The 1922–23 Harrison S.C. season was the second season for the club in the American Soccer League. The club finished the season in 7th place.

In the off-season, the club moved and became Newark F.C.

American Soccer League

Pld = Matches played; W = Matches won; D = Matches drawn; L = Matches lost; GF = Goals for; GA = Goals against; Pts = Points

National Challenge Cup

Notes and references
Bibliography

Footnotes

Harrison S.C.
American Soccer League (1921–1933) seasons
Harrison S.C.